Alternative worship is "what happens when people create worship for themselves," according to Steve Collins. As a phenomenon it began mainly in Europe, Australia and New Zealand in the late 1980s and early 1990s. It is practiced by Christians across the age-range, although has a particular following amongst adults in their 20s and 30s.

Alternative Worship usually refers to an approach to Christian worship and worship planning that emphasizes decentralized leadership, congregational participation, multi-sensory experience, ritual and narrative form. It is often discussed in contrast to Contemporary worship or "Youth" services. In fact it is (arguably) in part a reaction against, or a development beyond evangelical or charismatic forms of worship. It tends to use popular (secular) music forms in place of Christian worship songs, and more casual talks in place of the traditional sermon. Alternative Worship often does not have an obvious leader or stage, and may not involve singing or lecture-style presentations at all.

Alternative worship services often feature elements from ancient Christian spirituality and liturgy, such as a labyrinth, a kyrie, candle lighting and the sacraments in combination with very new elements, like projected images or video and/or electronic music.

Terms that are more appropriate to the approach used in these services would be Holistic Worship, Multisensory worship or Creative Worship.

Alternative worship is often associated with the Emerging Church.

References

The Book of Uncommon Prayer by Steven L Case (Zondervan 2002) 
Alternative Worship  by Jonny Baker and Doug Gay 
Multi-Sensory Church - Ready-to-use ideas for creative worship using, art, liturgies, rituals by Sue Wallace . Scripture Union 
Multi-Sensory Prayer - Creative prayer ideas using, art, the body, the senses by Sue Wallace . Scripture Union 
Multi-Sensory Scripture by Sue Wallace 
The Prodigal Project by Mike Riddell, Mark Pierson, Cathy Kirkpatrick.  London, SPCK, 2000 
Some Theological Reflections on Seeker Friendly Worship and Alternative Worship for Non-Churched People.  Windsor long-course essay.The Complex Christ''  by Kester Brewin.  London, SPCK, 2004

External links
Alternativeworship.org
Vaux

Emerging church movement